Chahardah Jofteh (also Romanized as Chahārdah Jofteh) is a village in Harasam Rural District, Homeyl District, Eslamabad-e Gharb County, Kermanshah Province, Iran. At the 2006 census, its population was 384, in 82 families.

References 

Populated places in Eslamabad-e Gharb County